Raquel Urtasun is a professor at the University of Toronto. Urtasun uses artificial intelligence, particularly deep learning, to make vehicles and other machines perceive the world more accurately and efficiently.

Education
Urtasun received her bachelor's degree in Telecommunication Engineering from the Universidad Publica de Navarra in 2000 and her Ph.D. degree from the Computer Science department at École Polytechnique Fédérale de Lausanne (EPFL) in 2006. Afterward, she was a postdoctoral scholar with Trevor Darrell, initially at MIT  (2006–2008) and then, following Darrell's move to the International Computer Science Institute, at UC Berkeley (2008–2009).

Career
Professor Urtasun's area of research is machine perception for self-driving cars. This work includes machine learning, computer vision, robotics and remote sensing. She was previously an assistant professor at the Toyota Technological Institute at Chicago (TTIC) (2009–2014) and a visiting professor at ETH Zurich (2010).

In May 2017, Uber hired Urtasun to lead a Toronto-based research team on self-driving cars. There, she led a research group in Uber's Advanced Technologies Group. Uber hired dozens of researchers and also made a multi-year, multi-million dollar commitment to Toronto's Vector Institute, which Urtasun co-founded. She worked for the University of Toronto one day per week and for Uber four days per week. She brought eight students with her.

In 2021, Urtasun left Uber and launched Waabi Innovation, focused on developing self-driving cars.

Awards and honours
Among Urtasun's awards are an NSERC E.W.R. Steacie Memorial Fellowship, an NVIDIA Pioneers of AI Award, a Ministry of Education and Innovation Early Researcher Award.  She is the recipient of Faculty Research Awards from both Amazon and Google, the latter three times.  She served as Program Chair of CVPR 2018, and is an editor of the International Journal in Computer Vision (IJCV). She has also served as Area Chair of several machine learning and vision conferences including NeurIPS, UAI, ICML, ICLR, CVPR, and ECCV.  She was selected as one of the Chatelaine Women of the Year 2018.

References

Canadian women academics
Academic staff of the University of Toronto
Spanish women academics
Spanish emigrants to Canada
Living people
Year of birth missing (living people)
École Polytechnique Fédérale de Lausanne alumni
Public University of Navarre alumni